The members of the 35th Manitoba Legislature were elected in the Manitoba general election held in September 1990. The legislature sat from October 11, 1990, to March 21, 1995.

The Progressive Conservative Party led by Gary Filmon formed the government.

Gary Doer of the New Democratic Party was Leader of the Opposition.

Denis Rocan served as speaker for the assembly.

There were six sessions of the 35th Legislature:

George Johnson was Lieutenant Governor of Manitoba until March 5, 1993, when Yvon Dumont became lieutenant governor.

Members of the Assembly 
The following members were elected to the assembly in 1990:

Notes:

By-elections 
By-elections were held to replace members for various reasons:

Notes:

References 

Terms of the Manitoba Legislature
1990 establishments in Manitoba
1995 disestablishments in Manitoba